is a 2001 Japanese animated fantasy film written and directed by Hayao Miyazaki, animated by Studio Ghibli for Tokuma Shoten, Nippon Television Network, Dentsu, Buena Vista Home Entertainment, Tohokushinsha Film, and Mitsubishi and distributed by Toho. The film features the voices of Rumi Hiiragi, Miyu Irino, Mari Natsuki, Takeshi Naito, Yasuko Sawaguchi, Tsunehiko Kamijō, Takehiko Ono, and Bunta Sugawara. Spirited Away tells the story of Chihiro Ogino (Hiiragi), a ten-year-old girl who, while moving to a new neighborhood, enters the world of Kami (spirits of Japanese Shinto folklore). After her parents are turned into pigs by the witch Yubaba (Natsuki), Chihiro takes a job working in Yubaba's bathhouse to find a way to free herself and her parents and return to the human world.

Miyazaki wrote the screenplay after he decided the film would be based on the ten-year-old daughter of his friend Seiji Okuda, the film's associate producer, who came to visit his house each summer. At the time, Miyazaki was developing two personal projects, but they were rejected. With a budget of US$19 million, production of Spirited Away began in 2000. Pixar animator John Lasseter, a fan and friend of Miyazaki, convinced Walt Disney Pictures to buy the film's North American distribution rights, and served as executive producer of its English-dubbed version. Lasseter then hired Kirk Wise as director and Donald W. Ernst as producer, while screenwriters Cindy and Donald Hewitt wrote the English-language dialogue to match the characters' original Japanese-language lip movements.

Originally released in Japan on 20 July 2001 by distributor Toho, the film received universal acclaim, grossing  at the worldwide box office. It held the record for 19 years until it was surpassed by Demon Slayer: Kimetsu no Yaiba – The Movie: Mugen Train in 2020.

Spirited Away is regarded as Miyazaki's magnum opus and has often been listed among the greatest films of all time. It won the Academy Award for Best Animated Feature at the 75th Academy Awards, making it the first, and to date only, hand-drawn and non-English-language animated film to win the award. It was the co-recipient of the Golden Bear at the 2002 Berlin International Film Festival (shared with Bloody Sunday), and is within the top ten on the British Film Institute's list of "Top 50 films for children up to the age of 14". In 2016, it was voted the fourth-best film of the 21st century by the BBC, as picked by 177 film critics from around the world, making it the highest-ranking animated film on the list. In 2017, it was also named the second "Best Film...of the 21st Century So Far" by The New York Times. In 2022, it was ranked as the 75th greatest film of all time by the Sight & Sound critics poll.

Plot

Ten-year-old Chihiro Ogino and her parents are traveling to their new home. Her father decides to take a shortcut and stops in front of a tunnel leading to what appears to be an abandoned amusement park, which Chihiro's father insists on exploring despite his daughter's protests. They find a restaurant stocked with food, which Chihiro's parents begin to eat. While exploring alone, Chihiro finds a bathhouse and meets a boy named Haku, who warns her to leave. However, Chihiro discovers that her parents have become pigs, and the exit is blocked.

Haku finds Chihiro and leads her toward the bathhouse. She sees several animals and creatures visiting the bathhouse, as well as No-Face (Kaonashi ), a masked spirit. Haku instructs her to ask for a job from the bathhouse's boiler-man, Kamaji, a yōkai commanding the susuwatari. Kamaji says that he already has enough susuwatari to help him. After Chihiro tries to help but inadvertently causes some disruption, Kamaji asks a worker named Lin to send Chihiro to Yubaba, the witch who runs the bathhouse. Lin leads her to the top floor to find the witch.

Yubaba tries to frighten Chihiro away, but Chihiro persists. Eventually, Yubaba reveals she took an oath to give work to anyone who asks for it, and gives Chihiro a working contract. Yubaba takes away the second kanji of her name, renaming her . Haku reveals he is also working for Yubaba, and takes her back downstairs.

The bathhouse workers dislike Sen, but give her work as Lin's assistant. Later that night, when Yubaba leaves, Haku finds Sen and shows her her parents, who are being held in pigpens. Haku explains that Yubaba controls people by taking their names; if she completely forgets hers like he once did, she will never be able to leave the spirit world. Sen is ostracized by the other workers. While working, she invites No-Face inside, believing him to be a customer.

The spirit of a polluted river arrives as Sen’s first customer. Sen discovers a bicycle handle sticking out of him, and the workers help to remove the bicycle and a large amount of garbage. He gives her a magic emetic dumpling as a token of gratitude. Meanwhile, No-Face imitates the gold left behind by the river spirit and tempts a worker with it before swallowing him. He demands food from the bathhouse and begins giving away extensive amounts of gold to its workers. Sen sees paper shikigami attacking a dragon and recognizes the dragon as Haku metamorphosed. When he crashes into Yubaba's penthouse with grievous injuries, Sen follows him upstairs. A shikigami stows away on her back.

No-Face is given large amounts of food, but soon begins eating more workers. In the penthouse, the stowaway shikigami shapeshifts into Yubaba's sister Zeniba, who turns Yubaba's son, Boh, into a mouse. Sen, Haku and Boh fall into the boiler room. Sen feeds Haku part of the emetic dumpling, causing him to vomit up a seal he stole, saving him from its deadly curse. Sen resolves to return the seal and apologize to Zeniba, taking Boh with her. She confronts an engorged No-Face, who reveals he is very lonely. Sen feeds No-Face the rest of the dumpling and he follows Sen out of the bathhouse, steadily regurgitating everything that he has eaten. Lin takes Sen to the station to see Zeniba, and Sen invites No-Face to follow, despite Lin's protests. Sen, No-Face, and Boh travel with train tickets given to Sen by Kamaji. Meanwhile, Yubaba orders that Sen's parents be slaughtered, but Haku reveals that Boh is missing.

Haku offers to retrieve Boh if Yubaba releases Sen and her parents. Yubaba agrees, but only if Sen can pass a final test. Sen meets with Zeniba, who makes her a magic hairband. Haku appears in dragon form, and Sen, Boh, and Haku leave for the bathhouse, leaving No-Face with Zeniba. When they arrive, Sen passes Yubaba's test to identify her parents, and she is allowed to leave. Haku vows to see her again, but she leaves the city with her parents, who do not remember anything after the restaurant.

Voice cast

Production

Development and inspiration

Every summer, Hayao Miyazaki spent his vacation at a mountain cabin with his family and five girls who were friends of the family. The idea for Spirited Away came about when he wanted to make a film for these friends. Miyazaki had previously directed films for small children and teenagers such as My Neighbor Totoro and Kiki's Delivery Service, but he had not created a film for ten-year-old girls. For inspiration, he read shōjo manga magazines like Nakayoshi and Ribon the girls had left at the cabin, but felt they only offered subjects on "crushes" and romance. When looking at his young friends, Miyazaki felt this was not what they "held dear in their hearts" and decided to produce the film about a young heroine whom they could look up to instead.

Miyazaki had wanted to produce a new film for years, but his two previous proposalsone based on the Japanese book  by Sachiko Kashiwaba, and another about a teenage heroinewere rejected. His third proposal, which ended up becoming Spirited Away, was more successful. The three stories revolved around a bathhouse that was inspired by one in Miyazaki's hometown. He thought the bathhouse was a mysterious place, and there was a small door next to one of the bathtubs in the bath house. Miyazaki was always curious to what was behind it, and he made up several stories about it, one of which inspired the bathhouse setting of Spirited Away.

Walt Disney Pictures financed ten percent of the film's production cost for the right of first refusal for American distribution. As with Princess Mononoke, Miyazaki and the Studio Ghibli staff experimented with computer animation. With the use of more computers and programs such as Softimage 3D, the staff learned the software, but used the technology carefully so that it enhanced the story, instead of "stealing the show". Each character was mostly hand-drawn, with Miyazaki working alongside his animators to see they were getting it just right. The biggest difficulty in making the film was to reduce its length. When production began, Miyazaki realized it would be more than three hours long if he made it according to his plot. He had to delete many scenes from the story, and tried to reduce the "eye candy" in the film because he wanted it to be simple. Miyazaki did not want to make the hero a "pretty girl". At the beginning, he was frustrated at how she looked "dull" and thought, "She isn't cute. Isn't there something we can do?" As the film neared the end, however, he was relieved to feel "she will be a charming woman."

Miyazaki based some of the buildings in the spirit world on the buildings in the real-life Edo-Tokyo Open Air Architectural Museum in Koganei, Tokyo, Japan. He often visited the museum for inspiration while working on the film. Miyazaki had always been interested in the Pseudo-Western style buildings from the Meiji period that were available there. The museum made Miyazaki feel nostalgic, "especially when I stand here alone in the evening, near closing time, and the sun is setting – tears well up in my eyes." While some guidebooks and articles claim that the old gold town of Jiufen in Taiwan served as an inspirational model for the film, Miyazaki has denied this. The Dōgo Onsen is also often said to be a key inspiration for the Spirited Away onsen/bathhouse.

Toshio Suzuki, the producer of the film, also cites European inspirations and influences in the production of Spirited Away. He specifically invokes the structure of the film as European-inspired due to Miyazaki's own influences by European films such as The Snow Queen and The Shepherdess and the Chimney Sweep.

Music

The film score of Spirited Away was composed and conducted by Miyazaki's regular collaborator Joe Hisaishi, and performed by the New Japan Philharmonic. The soundtrack received awards at the 56th Mainichi Film Competition Award for Best Music, the Tokyo International Anime Fair 2001 Best Music Award in the Theater Movie category, and the 17th Japan Gold Disk Award for Animation Album of the Year. Later, Hisaishi added lyrics to "One Summer's Day" and named the new version of the song  which was performed by Ayaka Hirahara.

The closing song,  was written and performed by Youmi Kimura, a composer and lyre-player from Osaka. The lyrics were written by Kimura's friend Wakako Kaku. In the special features of the Japanese DVD, Hayao Miyazaki explains how the song in fact inspired him to create Spirited Away. The song itself would be recognized as Gold at the 43rd Japan Record Awards.

Besides the original soundtrack, there is also an image album, titled , that contains 10 tracks.

English adaptation
John Lasseter, Pixar animator and a fan and friend of Miyazaki, would often sit with his staff and watch Miyazaki's work when encountering story problems. After seeing Spirited Away Lasseter was ecstatic. Upon hearing his reaction to the film, Disney CEO Michael Eisner asked Lasseter if he would be interested in introducing Spirited Away to an American audience. Lasseter obliged by agreeing to serve as the executive producer for the English adaptation. Following this, several others began to join the project: Beauty and the Beast co-director Kirk Wise and Aladdin co-producer Donald W. Ernst joined Lasseter as director and producer of Spirited Away, respectively. Screenwriters Cindy Davis Hewitt and Donald H. Hewitt penned the English-language dialogue, which they wrote in order to match the characters' original Japanese-language lip movements.

The cast of the film consists of Daveigh Chase, Jason Marsden, Suzanne Pleshette (in her final film role before her death in January 2008), Michael Chiklis, Lauren Holly, Susan Egan, David Ogden Stiers and John Ratzenberger (a Pixar regular). Advertising was limited, with Spirited Away being mentioned in a small scrolling section of the film section of Disney.com; Disney had sidelined their official website for Spirited Away and given the film a comparatively small promotional budget. Marc Hairston argues that this was a justified response to Studio Ghibli's retention of the merchandising rights to the film and characters, which limited Disney's ability to properly market the film.

Themes

Supernaturalism 
The major themes of Spirited Away, heavily influenced by Japanese Shinto-Buddhist folklore, centre on the protagonist, Chihiro, and her liminal journey through the realm of spirits. The central location of the film is a Japanese bathhouse where a great variety of Japanese folklore creatures, including kami, come to bathe. Miyazaki cites the solstice rituals when villagers call forth their local kami and invite them into their baths. Chihiro also encounters kami of animals and plants. Miyazaki says of this:Chihiro's archetypal entrance into another world demarcates her status as one somewhere between child and adult. Chihiro also stands outside societal boundaries in the supernatural setting. The use of the word kamikakushi (literally 'hidden by gods') within the Japanese title, and its associated folklore, reinforces this liminal passage: "Kamikakushi is a verdict of 'social death' in this world, and coming back to this world from Kamikakushi meant 'social resurrection.'"

Additional themes are expressed through No-Face, who reflects the characters who surround him, learning by example and taking the traits of whomever he consumes. This nature results in No-Face's monstrous rampage through the bathhouse. After Chihiro saves No-Face with the emetic dumpling, he becomes timid once more. At the end of the film, Zeniba decides to take care of No-Face so he can develop without the negative influence of the bathhouse.

Fantasy 
The film has been compared to Lewis Carroll's Alice's Adventures in Wonderland and Through the Looking Glass, as the stories have some elements in common such as being set in a fantasy world, the plots including a disturbance in logic and stability, and there being motifs such as food having metamorphic qualities; though developments and themes are not shared. Among other stories compared to Spirited Away, The Wonderful Wizard of Oz is seen to be more closely linked thematically.

Yubaba has many similarities to the Coachman from the 1940 film Pinocchio, in the sense that she mutates humans into pigs in a similar way that the boys of Pleasure Island were mutated into donkeys. Upon gaining employment at the bathhouse, Yubaba's seizure of Chihiro's true name symbolically kills the child, who must then assume adulthood. She then undergoes a rite of passage according to the monomyth format; to recover continuity with her past, Chihiro must create a new identity.

Traditional Japanese culture 
Spirited Away contains critical commentary on modern Japanese society concerning generational conflicts and environmental issues. Chihiro has been seen as a representation of the shōjo, whose roles and ideology had changed dramatically since post-war Japan. Just as Chihiro seeks her past identity, Japan, in its anxiety over the economic downturn occurring during the release of the film in 2001, sought to reconnect to past values. In an interview, Miyazaki has commented on this nostalgic element for an old Japan.

Western consumerism 
Accordingly, the film can be partly understood as an exploration of the effect of greediness and Western consumerism on traditional Japanese culture. For instance, Yubaba is stylistically unique within the bathhouse, wearing a Western dress and living among European décor and furnishings, in contrast with the minimalist Japanese style of her employees' quarters, representing the Western capitalist influence over Japan in its Meiji period and beyond. Along with its function within the ostensible coming of age theme, Yubaba's act of taking Chihiro's name and replacing it with Sen (an alternate reading of chi, the first character in Chihiro's name) can be thought of as symbolic of capitalism's single-minded concern with value.

The Meiji design of the abandoned theme park is the setting for Chihiro's parents' metamorphosis – the family arrives in an imported Audi car and the father wears a European-styled polo shirt, reassuring Chihiro that he has "credit cards and cash," before their morphing into literal consumerist pigs. Miyazaki has stated:
The bathhouse of the spirits cannot be seen as a place free of ambiguity and darkness. Many of the employees are rude to Chihiro because she is human, and corruption is ever-present; it is a place of excess and greed, as depicted in the initial appearance of No-Face. In stark contrast to the simplicity of Chihiro's journey and transformation is the constantly chaotic carnival in the background.

Environmentalism 
Commentators have often referred to environmental themes in the films of Miyazaki. In Spirited Away,  two major instances of allusions to environmental issues have been noted. Pam Coats, for example, a Vice President of Walt Disney Feature Animation, describes Chihiro dealing with the "stink spirit", who, it turns out, is actually a river spirit but is so corrupted with filth that one couldn't tell what it was at first glance. It only became clean again when Chihiro pulled out a huge amount of trash, including car tires, garbage, and a bicycle. This alludes to human pollution of the environment, and how people can carelessly toss away things without thinking of the consequences and of where the trash will go.

The second allusion is seen in Haku himself. Haku does not remember his name and lost his past, which is why he is stuck at the bathhouse. Eventually, Chihiro remembers that he used to be the spirit of the Kohaku River, which was destroyed and replaced with apartments. Because of humans' need for development, they destroyed a part of nature, causing Haku to lose his home and identity. This can be compared to deforestation and desertification; humans tear down nature, cause imbalance in the ecosystem, and demolish animals' homes to satisfy their want for more space (housing, malls, stores, etc.) but do not think about how it can affect other living things.

Release

Box office and theatrical release
Spirited Away was released theatrically in Japan on 20 July 2001 by distributor Toho. It grossed a record ¥1.6 billion ($13.1 million) in its first three days, beating the previous record set by Princess Mononoke. It was number one at the Japanese box office for its first eleven weeks and spent 16 weeks there in total. After 22 weeks of release and after grossing $224 million in Japan, it started its international release, opening in Hong Kong on 13 December 2001. It was the first film that had grossed more than $200 million at the worldwide box office excluding the United States. It went on to gross ¥30.4 billion to become the highest-grossing film in Japanese history, according to the Motion Picture Producers Association of Japan. It also set the all-time attendance record in Japan, surpassing the 16.8 million tickets sold by Titanic.

In February 2002, Wild Bunch, an international sales company that had recently spun off from its former parent StudioCanal, picked up the international sale rights for the film outside of Asia and France. The company would then on-sell it to independent distributors across the world. On April 13, 2002, The Walt Disney Company acquired the Taiwanese, Singapore, Hong Kong, French and North American sale rights to the film, alongside Japanese Home Media rights.

Disney's English dub of the film, supervised by Lasseter, premiered at the Toronto International Film Festival on 7 September 2002 and was later released in the United States on 20 September 2002. The film grossed $450,000 in its opening weekend from 26 theatres. Spirited Away had very little marketing, less than Disney's other B-films, with a maximum of 151 theatres showing the film in 2002. After the 2003 Oscars, it expanded to 714 theatres. It ultimately grossed around $10 million by September 2003. Outside of Japan and the United States, the movie was moderately successful in both South Korea and France where it grossed $11 million and $6 million, respectively. In Argentina, it is in the top 10 anime films with the most tickets sold.

In the United Kingdom, then-independent based film distributor Optimum Releasing acquired the rights to the movie from Wild Bunch in January 2003. The company then released it theatrically on 12 September 2003. The movie grossed $244,437 on its opening weekend from 51 theatres, and by the end of its theatrical run in October, the movie has grossed $1,383,023 in the country.

About 18 years after its original release in Japan, Spirited Away had a theatrical release in China on 21 June 2019. It follows the theatrical China release of My Neighbour Totoro in December 2018. The delayed theatrical release in China was due to long-standing political tensions between China and Japan, but many Chinese became familiar with Miyazaki's films due to rampant video piracy. It topped the Chinese box office with a  opening weekend, beating Toy Story 4 in China. In its second weekend, Spirited Away grossed a cumulative  in China, and was second only behind Spider-Man: Far From Home that weekend.

Spirited Away worldwide box office total stands at US$395,802,070.

Home media
Spirited Away was first released on VHS and DVD formats in Japan by Buena Vista Home Entertainment on 19 July 2002. The Japanese DVD releases include storyboards for the film and the special edition includes a Ghibli DVD player. Spirited Away sold 5.5million home video units in Japan by 2007, and holds the record for most home video copies sold of all-time in the country . The movie was released on Blu-ray by Walt Disney Studios Japan on 14 July 2014, and DVD was also reissued on the same day with a new HD master, alongside several other Studio Ghibli movies.

In North America, the film was released on DVD and VHS formats by Walt Disney Home Entertainment on 15 April 2003. The attention brought by the Oscar win resulted in the film becoming a strong seller. The bonus features include Japanese trailers, a making-of documentary which originally aired on Nippon Television, interviews with the North American voice actors, a select storyboard-to-scene comparison and The Art of Spirited Away, a documentary narrated by actor Jason Marsden. The movie was released on Blu-ray by and North America by Walt Disney Studios Home Entertainment on 16 June 2015. GKIDS and Shout! Factory re-issued the film on Blu-ray and DVD on 17 October 2017 following the expiration of Disney's previous deal with Studio Ghibli in the country in North America. On 12 November 2019, GKIDS and Shout! Factory issued a North-America-exclusive Spirited Away collector's edition, which includes the film on Blu-ray, and the film's soundtrack on CD, as well as a 40-page book with statements by Toshio Suzuki and Hayao Miyazaki, and essays by film critic Kenneth Turan and film historian Leonard Maltin. Along with the rest of the Studio Ghibli films, Spirited Away was released on digital markets in the United States for the first time, on 17 December 2019.

In the United Kingdom, the film was released on DVD and VHS as a rental release through independent distributor High Fliers Films PLC following the film's limited theatrical release. It was later officially released on DVD in the UK on 29 March 2004, with the distribution being done by Optimum Releasing themselves. In 2006, the DVD was reissued as a single-disc release (without the second one) with packaging matching other releases in Optimum's "The Studio Ghibli Collection" range. The then-renamed StudioCanal UK released the movie on Blu-ray on 24 November 2014, A British 20th Anniversary Collector's Edition, similar to other Studio Ghibli anniversary editions released in the UK, was released on 25 October 2021.

In the United States, the 2015 Blu-ray release grossed $9,925,660 from 557,613 physical units sold . In the United Kingdom, the film's Studio Ghibli anniversary release appeared several times on the annual lists of best-selling foreign language film on home video, ranking number six in 2015, number five in 2016, and number one in 2019.

Television 
The film was aired on Nippon TV (NTV) in Japan, on 24 January 2003. It became NTV's most-watched film of all time with a 46.9% audience rating, surpassing the 35.1% record previously set by Princess Mononoke in 1999.

In the United Kingdom, the film was watched by 670,000 viewers on BBC2 in 2010. This made it the year's most-watched foreign-language film on BBC, and the year's second highest foreign film on UK television (below the Indian Bollywood film Om Shanti Om). Spirited Away was later watched by 300,000 UK viewers on BBC2 in 2011, making it the year's most-watched foreign-language film on BBC2. Combined, the film drew a  UK television viewership on BBC2 between 2010 and 2011.

Reception

Critical response
Spirited Away received widespread acclaim. On review aggregator Rotten Tomatoes, the film holds a 97% approval rating based on 195 reviews, with an average rating of 8.6/10. The website's critics consensus reads, "Spirited Away is a dazzling, enchanting, and gorgeously drawn fairy tale that will leave viewers a little more curious and fascinated by the world around them." Metacritic, which uses a weighted average, assigned the film a score of 96 out of 100 based on 41 critics, indicating "universal acclaim."

Roger Ebert of the Chicago Sun-Times gave the film a full four stars, praising the work and Miyazaki's direction. Ebert also said that Spirited Away was one of "the year's best films", as well as adding it to his "Great Movies" list. Elvis Mitchell of The New York Times positively reviewed the film and praised the animation. Mitchell drew a favorable comparison to Lewis Carroll's Through the Looking-Glass, and wrote that Miyazaki's "movies are as much about moodiness as mood" and that "the prospect of animated figures' not being what they seem – either spiritually or physically – heightens the tension." Derek Elley of Variety said that Spirited Away "can be enjoyed by sprigs and adults alike" and praised the animation and music. Kenneth Turan of the Los Angeles Times praised Miyazaki's direction and the voice acting, as well as saying that the film is the "product of a fierce and fearless imagination whose creations are unlike anything a person has seen before." Orlando Sentinel critic Jay Boyar also praised Miyazaki's direction and said the film is "the perfect choice for a child who has moved into a new home."

In 2004, Cinefantastique listed the film as one of the "10 Essential Animations". In 2005, Spirited Away was ranked by IGN as the 12th-best animated film of all time. The film is also ranked number 9 of the highest-rated movies of all time on Metacritic, being the highest rated traditionally animated film on the site. The film ranked number 10 in Empire magazine's "The 100 Best Films of World Cinema" in 2010. In 2010, Rotten Tomatoes ranked it as the 13th-best animated film on the site, and in 2012, as the 17th. In 2019, the site considered the film to be #1 among 140 essential animated movies to watch. The film was ranked at number 46 on Time Out magazine's list of "The 100 Best Movies of All Time".  In 2017, The New York Times ranked it as the second best film of the 21st Century so far. In 2021, the Writers Guild of America ranked Spirted Away'''s screenplay the 67th greatest of the 21st century so far. In 2022, the film was ranked number 75 on Sight & Sound's greatest films list, being one of two animated films to make the list (alongside Miyazaki's own My Neighbor Totoro).

In his book Otaku, Hiroki Azuma observed: "Between 2001 and 2007, the otaku forms and markets quite rapidly won social recognition in Japan," and cites Miyazaki's win at the Academy Awards for Spirited Away among his examples.

Accolades

 Impact and legacy 
 Film industry Spirited Away is frequently regarded as one of the best films of the 21st century as well as one of the greatest animated films ever made. Comic Book Resources wrote that the film "set the bar extremely high for all anime movies that followed it -- including Studio Ghibli's." and further explained that "It's a movie many people re-watch due to its comfort and nostalgia, and since Netflix brought the Ghibli movies to North America last year, it's become even more accessible". Swapnil Dhruv Bose Far Out Magazine declared the film to be "the greatest animated film of all time" and explained that it "resonated with audiences all over the world despite the existence of cultural barriers is because of its brilliantly devised universality" and has the ability to "generate fascinating multiplicities which morph according to the age of the viewer". In another article detailing Hayao Miyazaki's wide impact to the film industry, he wrote "The influence of Spirited Away can be easily observed in Disney productions like Brave and Frozen, thanks to John Lasseter's (the Chief Creative Officer of Pixar) efforts to introduce it to Western audiences". Vice also declared Spirited Away to be the all-time best animated film and wrote that the film "showed how breathtaking, heartfelt, and serious animation can be" that "Pixar, Disney, and other mainstream animators have still failed to genuinely realize 15 years later".

Film director Steven Spielberg said that Spirited Away might be "better than any Disney films" he has ever seen. Rayna Denison, professor of film, television, and media studies, told Time that "This is a film made by a master animator at the height of his powers and it is one where the quality of the animation really does set it apart from everything else around it. Nobody else was making films that looked like this or that were as inventive as this was at this time". The film has been cited as influence for various Disney and Pixar animated films. Production designer Harley Jessup said that he initially looked at Spirited Away and was inspired by the spiritual feelings elements to utilize them in Coco. Co-writers Ken and Ryan Firpo cited the film as one of the influences that helps them explore "ideas of morality and humanity" in Eternals.  Turning Red director Domee Shi named Spirited Away as one of her favorite animated films and one of the influences for her film.

Commercial and cultural significance
According to Time, Spirited Away "arrived at a time when animation was widely perceived as a genre solely for children, and when cultural differences often became barriers to the global distribution of animated works" but it "shattered preconceived notions about the art form and also proved that, as a film created in Japanese with elements of Japanese folklore central to its core, it could resonate deeply with audiences around the world". Denison emphasized that John Lasseter and Disney "boosted Spirited Away visibility in America by heavily campaigning for the film to be considered for the Academy Awards", and cited it as one of the reasons why it won Academy Award for Best Animated Feature. Writer Jonathan Clements, whose published works revolve around East Asian culture, anime, and Japanese television dramas, emphasized that the film's Oscar win was "a wake-up call for a lot of people in the film business who had been disregarding Japanese animation for years". Susan Napier, professor of Japanese studies at Tufts University, called Spirited Away wins at major Western award shows "a very big shot in the arm to the Japanese animation industry". She further explained that cartoons in the West have often been seen as "childish, vulgar, things that you didn't take seriously" but after the film took home the Academy Award, people were starting to see animation as "a real art form".

Stage adaptation
A stage adaptation of Spirited Away was announced in February 2021 with a world premiere planned in Tokyo on February 28, 2022. It is written and directed by John Caird, with Toho as the production company, with Studio Ghibli's blessing. The role of Chihiro is played by both Kanna Hashimoto and Mone Kamishiraishi. 

On a limited time release from November 11 to December 18 in 2022,{ the Imperial Theater performance of the play was available for rental in Japan in several streaming services such as Abema, Amazon Prime Video Japan, Docomo Anime Store, FOD, Hulu Japan and U-Next.

There were 2 versions of the play available for rental:

 . Japanese: 
 . Japanese: 

See also

 2000s in film
 Isekai List of highest-grossing anime films
 List of highest-grossing films in Japan
 Noppera-bō: Japanese "no-face" spirit

Notes

References

Further reading
 Boyd, James W., and Tetsuya Nishimura. 2004. "Shinto Perspectives in Miyazaki's Anime Film 'Spirited Away'." The Journal of Religion and Film 8(2).
 
 Callis, Cari. 2010. "Nothing that Happens is ever Forgotten." In Anime and Philosophy, edited by J. Steiff and T. D. Tamplin. New York: Open Court. .
 
 
 

 

 
 
 
 

 
Suzuki, Ayumi. 2009. "A nightmare of capitalist Japan: Spirited Away", Jump Cut 51
Yang, Andrew. 2010. "The Two Japans of 'Spirited Away'." International Journal of Comic Art'' 12(1):435–52.

External links

 
 
 
 
 
 
 
 
 Spirited Away at the Japanese Movie Database 
 75th Academy Awards Winners | Oscar Legacy | Academy of Motion Picture Arts and Sciences

2000s children's animated films
2000s children's fantasy films
2000s coming-of-age films
2000s Japanese-language films
2001 anime films
2001 fantasy films
2001 films
Animated coming-of-age films
Animated films about dragons
Anime with original screenplays
Annie Award winners
Best Animated Feature Academy Award winners
Best Animated Feature Annie Award winners
Best Animated Feature Broadcast Film Critics Association Award winners
Coming-of-age anime and manga
Films about curses
Films about families
Films about frogs
Films about kidnapping
Films about parallel universes
Films about shapeshifting
Films about witchcraft
Films directed by Hayao Miyazaki
Films scored by Joe Hisaishi
Films set in 2001
Films set in Japan
Golden Bear winners
Isekai anime and manga
Japanese animated fantasy films
Japanese coming-of-age films
Japanese fantasy adventure films
Japanese ghost films
Japanese mythology in anime and manga
Picture of the Year Japan Academy Prize winners
Studio Ghibli animated films
Toho animated films
Yōkai in anime and manga